Agung Suprayogi (born December 4, 1984) is an Indonesian footballer that last played for Persela Lamongan in the Indonesia Super League.

References

External links

1984 births
Association football forwards
Living people
Indonesian footballers
Liga 1 (Indonesia) players
Persih Tembilahan players
Persisam Putra Samarinda players
Arema F.C. players
Persela Lamongan players
Indonesian Premier Division players